SS Colne was a freight vessel built for the Goole Steam Shipping Company in 1903.

History

She was built in 1903 by the Cylde Shipbuilding Company Port Glasgow as one of a trio of ships which included SS Nidd and SS Humber. She was launched on 25 July 1903.

In 1905 she came under the ownership of the Lancashire and Yorkshire Railway.

She sank on 11 March 1906 when her cargo of coal shifted in a storm. Fifteen horses penned between the decks were drowned. Twelve of the crew were drowned, and seven were rescued from a lifeboat by the crew of the Ramsgate fishing vessel  Uncle Dick.

References

1903 ships
Steamships of the United Kingdom
Ships built on the River Clyde
Ships of the Lancashire and Yorkshire Railway